Vuka may refer to:

 Vuka, Osijek-Baranja County, town and municipality in eastern Croatia
 Vuka, one of the counties of the Independent State of Croatia
 Vuka (river), a river in Croatia
 Vuka, Free State, a township in Dihlabeng Local Municipality, South Africa
 Vuka (plant), an African Helichrysum species
 Vuka, a surname:
 Vuka Šeherović (1903–1976), Bosnian folk singer
 Marijan Vuka (born 1980), Croatian footballer

See also
 Vukas, a surname
 Vuca (disambiguation)